Morishige Yamamoto (20 December 1882 – 27 January 1962) was a Japanese equestrian. He competed in two events at the 1932 Summer Olympics.

References

External links

1882 births
1962 deaths
Japanese male equestrians
Olympic equestrians of Japan
Equestrians at the 1932 Summer Olympics
Place of birth missing
Road incident deaths in Japan